The 1st Illinois General Assembly, consisting of the Illinois Senate and the Illinois House of Representatives, met from October 4, 1818, to March 31, 1819, during the first two years of Shadrach Bond's governorship, at The Kaskaskia State House.   The apportionment of seats in the House of Representatives was based on the provisions of the First Illinois Constitution.  Political parties were not established in the State at the time.

It was succeeded by the 2nd Illinois General Assembly.

Members 
This list is arranged by chamber, then by county. Senators and Representatives were both allotted to counties roughly by population and elected at-large within their districts. Two counties shared one senator.

Senate
Bond County
 Martin Jones

Crawford County
 Joseph Kitchell

Edwards County
 Guy W. Smith

Gallatin County
 Michael Jones

Jackson County
 Conrad Will

Johnson and Franklin Counties
 Thomas Roberts

Madison County
 George Cadwell

Monroe County
 Alexander Jamison

Pope County
 Lewis Barker

St. Clair County
 William Kinney

Randolph County
 John McFerron, resigned July 8, 1819

Union County
 Thomas Cox

Washington County
 Zariah Maddux

White County
 Willis Hargrave

House of Representatives
Bond County
 Francis Kirkpatrick

Crawford County
 David Porter
 Scott Riggs

Edwards County
 Levi Compton
 Henry Utter

Franklin County
 Elijah Ewing

Gallatin County
 John G. Daimwood
 Adolphus F. Hubbard
 John Marshall, resigned

Jackson County
 Jesse Griggs

Johnson County
 Isaac D. Wilcox

Madison County
 John Howard
 Abraham Prickett
 Samuel Whiteside

Monroe County
 William Alexander

Pope County
 Green B. Field
 Robert Hamilton

St. Clair County
 John Messinger
 Risdon Moore
 James D. Thomas

Randolph County
 Edward Humphreys
 Samuel Walker

Union County
 Jesse Echols
 John Whitaker

Washington County
 Daniel S. Swearengen

White County
 William McHenry
 William Nash
 Alexander Phillips

Employees

Senate 
 Secretary: William C. Greenup
 Doorkeeper: Ezra Owen

House of Representatives 
 Clerk: Thomas Reynolds
 Enrolling and Engrossing Clerk: Timothy Davis
 Assistant Enrolling and Engrossing Clerk: Milton Ladd
 Doorkeeper: Charles McNabb

See also
 List of Illinois state legislatures

References

Illinois legislative sessions
Randolph County, Illinois
Illinois
Illinois
1818 in Illinois
1819 in Illinois